Margaret Penrose was a house pseudonym used by the Stratemeyer Syndicate as the author of three girls' book series published by Cupples & Leon.

The name Margaret Penrose was used for:
 The Dorothy Dale series – 1908 to 1924, 13 volumes
 The Motor Girls series – 1910 to 1917, 10 volumes
 The Radio Girls series – 1922 to 1924, 4 volumes

The Dorothy Dale series was ghostwritten by the following authors: Lilian Garis volumes 1 – 8, 11; W. Bert Foster volumes 9, 10, 12; and Elizabeth Duffield Ward volume 13.

References

External links
 
 
 

Stratemeyer Syndicate pseudonyms